Chauntelle Tibbals is a sociologist from the United States. Her scholarly focus includes studies in gender, sexualities, work and organizations, media and new media, popular culture, and qualitative research methods.

Early life 

Tibbals was born in Paramount, California, a suburb of Los Angeles, and grew up in and around the LA area.

Education 

Tibbals completed her undergraduate studies at UCLA (2000), received her master's degree from CSUN (2003), and obtained her Ph.D. from UT-Austin in Sociology, with a portfolio in Women's & Gender Studies (2010).

She was a visiting scholar in University of Southern California’s Department of Sociology during 2012–13.

Career 
Tibbals' scholarly focus includes sociological studies in gender, sexualities, work and organizations, media and new media, popular culture, and qualitative research methods.

Her research over the past decade centers on the sociocultural significance of adult content and adult content production, including issues related to law, free speech, and workplace organizational structures. Tibbals writes and speaks frequently about issues related to higher education, law, gender identity and expression, and sexualities.

She was also a contributing writer to the Routledge journal Porn Studies.

Tibbals is a regular contributor for online media outlet Uproxx.

She is regularly asked to comment on sex, tech, and culture on mainstream media sites, including CNN, NBC News, NPR, ABC-Univision, Vice, Al Jazeera, Bloomberg TV, and the Huffington Post.

Bibliography 
Thesis
 

Journal articles
 
 
 
 
 
Cited in: 
 

Book chapters
 

Books

Notes 

 Spellman, Jim. (July 19, 2012) “Porn Stars Use Twitter to Go Mainstream”. CNN.com
 Hess, Amanda. (August 16, 2013) “Millions of Americans Watch Porn. But for Academics, Studying It Remains a Challenge”. Slate.com
 Mantle, Larry. (August 30, 2013) “Is Los Angeles Still a Porn Production Hub after Measure B Passed?”. SCPR.org
 Menendez, Alicia. (November 8, 2013) “Technology: Ya Can’t Have Sex With It and Ya Can’t Have Sex Without It”. Fusion.net
 Pappas, Stephanie. (March 21, 2014) “New Porn Studies Journal Launches”. LiveScience.com
 Barth, Rachel. (March 29, 2014) “Porn is Finally About to Be Taken Seriously”. Vice.com
 Sedor, Justin. (April 20, 2014) “Porn: Why We Make It, Why We Watch It”. Refinery29.com
 Hayoun, Massoud. (April 29, 2014) “Porn Stars Battle Stigma with Sex Awareness Amid Bank Account Closures”. AlJazeera America
 Michalopoulos, Deanna. (May 2014) “Why Is Objectification Bad?”. Bustle.com
 Dickson, E.J. (May 3, 2014) “Porn Stars are Mad at Samuel L Jackson for Jokingly Endorsing Piracy”. DailyDot.com
 Gwynn, Michele. (May 5, 2014) “Young Male Students and Predatory Female Teachers”. Examiner.com
 Innovation Crush. (May 2014) “Sex Cells”. SideShowNetwork

References

External links 
 

Living people
American sociologists
American women sociologists
California State University, Northridge alumni
People from Los Angeles
University of California, Los Angeles alumni
University of Southern California faculty
University of Texas at Austin College of Liberal Arts alumni
People from Paramount, California
Year of birth missing (living people)
21st-century American women